Julio Lacarte Muró (March 29, 1918 – March 4, 2016) was a Uruguayan diplomat and politician.

A man of the Colorado Party, he ran for Vice-President in 1966. In 1967 he served as Minister of Industry and Commerce in the cabinet of President Oscar Gestido. He also served in several diplomatic and commercial posts: LAFTA, GATT, WTO, UNCTAD, IBRD, OAS. He was a Member of the Appellate Body of the World Trade Organization.

Between 1967 and 1969, he served as president of the Uruguayan Football Association

Career 
On September 24, 1956 he was appointed ambassador in Washington D.C.
On February 22, 1963 he was accredited as Uruguayan Ambassador to Belgium.

References

1918 births
2016 deaths
Colorado Party (Uruguay) politicians
Government ministers of Uruguay
Uruguayan vice-presidential candidates
Members of the Appellate Body
Ambassadors of Uruguay to Argentina
Ambassadors of Uruguay to Bolivia
Ambassadors of Uruguay to Ecuador
Ambassadors of Uruguay to Germany
Ambassadors of Uruguay to India
Ambassadors of Uruguay to Japan
Ambassadors of Uruguay to Thailand
Ambassadors of Uruguay to the United States
Presidents of the Uruguayan Football Association